Shyam Sukhi Balika Siksha Niketan is a girls' secondary school located in Gazole, Malda district, West Bengal, India.

References

Girls' schools in West Bengal
Schools in Malda district
High schools and secondary schools in West Bengal
Educational institutions established in 1969
1969 establishments in West Bengal